Staffordsville is an unincorporated community in Giles County, Virginia, United States. Staffordsville has a post office with ZIP code 24167.

References

Unincorporated communities in Giles County, Virginia
Unincorporated communities in Virginia